The 1974 United States Senate election in New York was held on November 5, 1974. Incumbent Republican U.S. Senator Jacob Javits won against Democratic challenger Ramsey Clark in a three-way election.

Major candidates

Republican
Jacob Javits, incumbent U.S. Senator

Democratic
Ramsey Clark, former United States Attorney General
Lee Alexander, Mayor of Syracuse
Abraham Hirschfeld, real estate developer
Allard K. Lowenstein, former U.S. Representative (Withdrew after losing at the Convention)

Conservative
Barbara A. Keating
Roy Cohn, attorney

The convention used a weighted voting system. Cohn was eligible to seek a primary, but opted not to.

Results

See also
1974 United States Senate elections

References

New York
1974
1974 New York (state) elections